Mariekerke is a former municipality in the Dutch province of Zeeland. The municipality was formed in a merger of Aagtekerke, Grijpskerke and Meliskerke in 1966, and existed until 1997 when it merged into the municipality of Veere.

The municipality was named after the former village of Mariekerke, which is now a hamlet named Klein Mariekerke.

References

States and territories established in 1966
1966 establishments in the Netherlands
Municipalities of the Netherlands disestablished in 1997
Former municipalities of Zeeland
Veere